Dongba Area is an area and township within Chaoyang District, Beijing, China. It is at the banks of Ba River, between the 5th and 6th Ring Roads of Beijing. It borders Cuigezhuang Township to the north, Jinzhan Township to the east, Pingfang and Changying Townships to the south, Dongfeng and Jiangtai Townships to the west. According to the 2020 Chinese census, the area had 124,163 inhabitants.

The name of the area Dongba refers to a dam that used to be in the region. It was one of the seven dams constructed during Yuan dynasty.

History

Administrative Divisions 
As of 2021, the area consists of 32 subdivisions, with 23 residential communities and 9 villages:

See also 
 List of township-level divisions of Beijing

References

Chaoyang District, Beijing
Areas of Beijing